Luigi Scorrano (June 1849 – June 15, 1924) was an Italian painter who won many awards and was given a pension by the Italian government.

Career 
Born at Lecce in Apulia, Scorrano studied at the Academy of Naples and became a prolific artist, often exhibiting his work at the National Expositions and Promotrici. For example, at the Promotrice of Naples, he exhibited: How Many Sad Memories! and Teliclio. He exhibited at Livorno Una canzone d' amore; at Genoa Una canzone; in Naples La toelette di nozze; in Rome Baptism of Montecassino; Rebecca; L'Ambasciata dì matrimonio (once found in the Ministry of Justice of Rome); I regali alla sposa; and Un Racconto, once found in the Hall of the Provincial Council of Naples with a reproduction of the Baptism of Montecassino; Gioie intime, exhibited at Milan; Conforto e lavoro, exhibited at Venice.

In the Council Hall of the town of Terlizzi in the Province of Bari, he painted allegorical figures. In a further Naples Exposition, he exhibited among others: Un cliente di merito, a Pompeian Scene, and Un negoziante di stoffe. He was named director of the Institute of the Royal School of Painting in Urbino. He painted a canvas of the Madonna del Carmelo (1913) for the Chapel of Anime Santa in Trepuzzi, in Province of Lecce. His paintings recall the influence of Filippo Palizzi.

Death 
He died at Urbano in 1924.

References

1849 births
1924 deaths
People from Lecce
19th-century Italian painters
Italian male painters
20th-century Italian painters
Painters from Naples
19th-century Italian male artists
20th-century Italian male artists